Jamie Arnold (born March 10, 1975) is an American-Israeli former professional basketball player. Playing as a power forward, he represented the Israeli national team. In 1998–99, he was the top rebounder in the Israeli Basketball Premier League.

High school
Arnold played high school basketball at Oak Park High School in Michigan.

College career
Arnold played college basketball at Wichita State University, with the Wichita State Shockers.

Professional career
Arnold played with seven European club teams, starting in Belgium in 1997 and playing until 2011. In 1998–99, he was the top rebounder in the Israeli Basketball Premier League. His last team was Hapoel Holon of Israel.

Coaching career
In 2014, Arnold started as the Varsity boys head coach along with Junior Varsity coaches Michael Williams and Michael Williams Jr. at The Jean and Samuel Frankel Jewish Academy of Metropolitan Detroit.

Awards and achievements

Team
  
02–03 – Won the Slovenian National League Championship
02–03 – EuroCup finalist
05–06 – Won the Israeli National League Championship
05–06 – Won the Israeli National Cup
05–06 – EuroLeague finalist
06–07 – Won the Israeli National League Championship
07–08 – Won the Israeli National Cup
09–10 – Italian League finalist

Individual
  
98–99 – Led the Israeli League in total player evaluation (#1 player rating)
98–99 – Led the Israeli League in rebounding (9.6 rebounds per game)
00–01 – Led the French Pro A League in rebounding (11.3 rebounds per game)
00–01 – Named French Pro A – Most Complete Player Award 
02–03 – Played in the Slovenian League All Star Game
02–03 – Named the Slovenian League All Star Game MVP
02–03 – Named the best player not in the EuroLeague, by the website Eurobasket.com
03–04 – Named EuroCup Week-5 MVP0
08-09 he was the NBA mvp 
06–07 – Named EuroLeague Week-16 MVP
07–08 – Named EuroCup Week-3 MVP
07–08 – Named EuroCup Week-4 MVP
07–08 – Named Israeli Cup MVP
07–08 – Named Israeli 1st Team "Starting Five"
07–08 – Led the Israeli League in total evaluation (#1 player rating)
07–08 – Led the Israeli League in field goal percentage
09–10 – Named Greek League MVP Week-3 
09–10 – Named Greek League MVP of November
09–10 – Named MVP of the Italian League playoffs game one, in the second round, vs. JuveCaserta Basket, for Olimpia Milano, making all 8 field goal attempts

References

External links
Jamie Arnold at the Euroleague official site

1975 births
Living people
ABA League players
ALM Évreux Basket players
American expatriate basketball people in Belgium
American expatriate basketball people in Cyprus
American expatriate basketball people in France
American expatriate basketball people in Greece
American expatriate basketball people in Israel
American expatriate basketball people in Italy
American expatriate basketball people in Slovenia
American expatriate basketball people in Spain
American men's basketball players
Basketball players from Detroit
Hapoel Galil Elyon players
Hapoel Holon players
Hapoel Jerusalem B.C. players
Israeli American
Israeli expatriate sportspeople in Spain
Israeli men's basketball players
Israeli people of African-American descent
Joventut Badalona players
KK Krka players
Liga ACB players
Maccabi Tel Aviv B.C. players
Olimpia Milano players
Peristeri B.C. players
Power forwards (basketball)
Oak Park High School (Michigan) alumni
Virtus Bologna players
Wichita State Shockers men's basketball players